Athmane Hadj Lazib (born May 10, 1983 in Hadjout) is a hurdler from Algeria. In 2010 he competed at the 2010 African Championships in Nairobi and won the gold medal in the 110 metre hurdles with a time of 13.77.

He has personal bests of 13.46 seconds in the 110 metres hurdles (2011) and 7.72 in the 60 metres hurdles (2011). Both are current national records.

Competition record

External links

Algerian male hurdlers
1983 births
Living people
People from Hadjout
Mediterranean Games bronze medalists for Algeria
Athletes (track and field) at the 2013 Mediterranean Games
African Games gold medalists for Algeria
African Games medalists in athletics (track and field)
Mediterranean Games medalists in athletics
Athletes (track and field) at the 2007 All-Africa Games
Athletes (track and field) at the 2011 All-Africa Games
21st-century Algerian people
20th-century Algerian people